The Mountain (La Montagne) is a monumental sculpture by the French artist Aristide Maillol. Dina Vierny, the artist's longtime collaborator, served as a model for the sculpture.

The sculpture, carved in stone, was commissioned by the Musée National d'Art Moderne in 1936 and now can be found at the Museum of Fine Arts of Lyon. La Montagne was also cast in lead by the Rudier Foundry and the Emile Godard Foundry in an edition of six numbered casts, as four artist's proofs, and as two estate casts. In addition to gracing a number of private collections, casts of La Montagne can be viewed at these locations:
 Jardin des Tuileries, Paris
 Norton Simon Museum, Pasadena
 National Gallery of Australia, Canberra
 St. Louis Art Museum, Missouri
 Columbus Museum of Art, Ohio
 Musée Maillol, Paris
 Tel Aviv Museum of Art, Israel
 Kenyon College, Ohio

References

1930s sculptures
Sculptures by Aristide Maillol
Sculptures of women
1937 sculptures
Nude sculptures

fr:La Montagne (Maillol)